Witches to the North (Italian: Streghe verso nord) is a 2001 Italian comedy film directed by Giovanni Veronesi.

Cast
Teo Mammucari as Teo Sellari
Paul Sorvino as Gallio De Dominicis
Emmanuelle Seigner as Lucilla
Daniele Liotti as Paolo Sellari
Anna Valle as Carlotta
Dario Bandiera as Saro
Bianca Guaccero as Selvaggia
Valeria Cavalli as the secretary
Vittorio Amandola as Baffone
Gérard Depardieu as himself
Federica Fontana as herself

References

External links

2001 films
Films directed by Giovanni Veronesi
2000s Italian-language films
2001 comedy films
Italian comedy films
2000s Italian films